Amblymora strandiella is a species of beetle in the family Cerambycidae. It was described by Stephan von Breuning in 1943. It is known from Moluccas.

References

Amblymora
Beetles described in 1943